Harry Potter and the Philosopher's Stone is a novel by J. K. Rowling.

Harry Potter and the Philosopher's Stone may also refer to:
 Harry Potter and the Philosopher's Stone (film), the novel's film adaptation
 Harry Potter and the Philosopher's Stone (soundtrack), the soundtrack based on the film, composed by John Williams
 Harry Potter and the Philosopher's Stone (video game), a video game based on the film